The 342nd Fighter Day Wing (FDW) is an inactive United States Air Force wing. Its last duty assignment was at Myrtle Beach AFB, South Carolina.

History
On 25 July 1956, the 342nd Fighter Day Wing was established and activated at Myrtle Beach AFB, South Carolina.   The Wing's subordinate components were the 342nd Fighter-Day Group; the 342nd Air Base Group and the 455th Fighter-Day Group, all being assigned to the wing as subordinate units.

The Wing Commander was Colonel Robert G. Emmens.

The total manpower force of the 342nd FDW at the time of its activation was 20 Officers, 1 Warrant Officer and 241 enlisted men, with the majority of the personnel being reassigned from the 4434th Air Base Squadron, (established on 9 April 1956) being redesignated as the 342nd Air Base Group on 25 July 1956.

On 10 September 1956, the 342nd FDW received a new commander, Colonel Francis S. Gabreski. Colonel Emmens assumed the role of Deputy Base Commander at that time.

The 342 FDW's mission was officially that of a fully functional fighter-day wing. In reality, the efforts and activities of the 342 FDW were directed to reach operational capabilities by overcoming the problems and obstacles inherent in the activation of a new fighter wing on a base still largely under construction.  Close liaison was maintained between units at Shaw AFB, SC for many activities. There were regularly scheduled truck convoys between Shaw and Myrtle Beach during the Wing's development.

The 342 FDW lasted 117 days until 18 November 1956. On 19 November, the Air Force redesignated the unit as the 354th Fighter-Day Wing, absorbing all personnel and assets of the 342nd FDW.   The 342nd FDW and 342nd FDG was inactivated along with the 455th Fighter-Day Group.

Lineage
 Established as 342nd Fighter Day Wing on 25 July 1956 and activated
 Inactivated with personnel and equipment being redesignated as 354th Fighter-Day Wing on 18 November 1956

Components
 342nd Fighter-Day Group, 25 July – 19 November 1956
 455th Fighter-Day Group, 25 July – 19 November 1956

Major Commands
 Ninth Air Force, 25 July 1956 – 18 November 1956

Bases assigned
 Myrtle Beach Air Force Base, South Carolina, 25 July 1956 – 18 November 1956

Major aircraft assigned
 RF-80 Shooting Star (1956)

References

 Ravenstein, Charles A. (1984). Air Force Combat Wings Lineage and Honors Histories 1947–1977. Maxwell AFB, Alabama: Office of Air Force History. .
 History of the 342nd Fighter Day Wing, 354th TFW Office of History, Myrtle Beach Air Force Base, 1956 (USAFHRA Microfilm Record)

External links

342
Military units and formations in South Carolina